
Gmina Chlewiska is a rural gmina (administrative district) in Szydłowiec County, Masovian Voivodeship, in east-central Poland.

Villages
Gmina Chlewiska contains the villages and settlements of Aleksandrów, Antoniów, Borki, Broniów, Budki, Chlewiska, Cukrówka, Huta, Koszorów, Krawara, Leszczyny, Majdanki, Nadolna, Ostałów, Ostałówek, Pawłów, Skłoby, Stanisławów, Stefanków, Sulistrowice, Wola Zagrodnia, Zaława and Zawonia.

Neighbouring gminas
Gmina Chlewiska is bordered by the gminas of Bliżyn, Borkowice, Przysucha, Stąporków, Szydłowiec and Wieniawa.

References
Polish official population figures 2006

Chlewiska
Szydłowiec County